The 38 cm Siegfried K (E) was a German World War II railway gun based on the 38 cm SK C/34 naval gun that served as the main armament of the s.  Only four were produced. K stands for Kanone (cannon), E  for Eisenbahnlafette (on railroad mounting).

Design
Like the 38 cm SK C/34 naval guns deployed as coastal defense, the 38 cm Siegfried K guns were modified with a larger chamber to handle the increased amount of propellant used for the special long-range Siegfried shells.

The gun had no ability to traverse on its mount, relying instead on moving along a curving section of track or on a Vögele turntable to aim. The turntable (Drehscheibe) consisted of a circular track with a pivot mount in the center for a platform on which the railroad gun itself was secured. A ramp was used to raise the railway gun to the level of the platform. The platform had rollers at each end which rested on the circular rail for 360° traverse. The gun could only be loaded at 0° elevation and so had to be re-aimed for each shot.

Ammunition
The gun used the standard German naval system of ammunition where the base charge was held in a metallic cartridge case and supplemented by another charge in a silk bag which was rammed first. 

Four types of shells were used by the 38 cm Siegfried K (E), including the special long-range Siegfried shell (Siegfried—Granate) developed by the army. With a full charge it reached  and could travel –equivalent to over 34.5 miles.

Notes

References
 Campbell, John. Naval Weapons of World War Two. London: Conway Maritime Press, 2002 
 François, Guy. Eisenbahnartillerie: Histoire de l'artillerie lourd sur voie ferrée allemande des origines à 1945. Paris: Editions Histoire et Fortifications, 2006
 Gander, Terry and Chamberlain, Peter. Weapons of the Third Reich: An Encyclopedic Survey of All Small Arms, Artillery and Special Weapons of the German Land Forces 1939-1945. New York: Doubleday, 1979 
 Hogg, Ian V. German Artillery of World War Two. 2nd corrected edition. Mechanicsville, PA: Stackpole Books, 1997 
 Kosar, Franz. Eisenbahngeschütz der Welt. Stuttgart: Motorbook, 1999

External links 

  38 cm Siegfried K (E) at NavWeaps.com
 Canons de l'Apocalypse

 

World War II artillery of Germany
Railway guns
380 mm artillery
Weapons and ammunition introduced in 1941